Insan  is a 2005 Indian Hindi-language action thriller film, starring Ajay Devgn, Akshay Kumar, Lara Dutta, Esha Deol and Tusshar Kapoor. Directed by K. Subash, it is a remake of Telugu film Khadgam (2002), directed by Krishna Vamsi.

Insan released on 14th January 2005 to mixed-to-negative reviews from critics, with most of them praising Kumar's performance and was commercially unsuccessful, grossing only ₹104.1 million worldwide against a budget of ₹125 million.

Plot
Amjad (Akshay Kumar), an auto rickshaw driver, who is searching his long lost brother Munna, and struggler Avinash (Tusshar Kapoor) who wants to be a star in Bollywood industry. Amjad wants to marry his lover Heena (Esha Deol). But her parents want her to marry a rich man. So Amjad plans to win her parents' trust by a fake drama with Avinash and his friend to act as fake goons and they involve Rathod to arrest and win Heena's heart. The plan goes wrong as real goons appear but Amjad fights them leading Heena's parents agreeing to marry her to Amjad. Meanwhile, Inspector Ajit Rathod (Ajay Devgn) is on a mission to eliminate a notorious terrorist Azhar Khan (Rahul Dev) who killed his wife (Koena Mitra) and the latter is underground from the eyes of law and planning to destroy Mumbai. Avinash, who is a struggler, on the other hand, loses his job as an extra in films after an argument with an egoistic actor. A newcomer Indu (Laila) is helped by Avinash to enter the industry and soon both fall in love with each other not knowing that she had been subjected to a compromise with the producer Agarwal. Hopeless, Avinash decides to be an auto-rickshaw driver but Indu apologises and encourages Avinash to be a good actor. Soon, Avinash and Indu's luck turns when the filmmaker (Asrani) casts them as leads in his next film after being impressed on their acting skills. Meghna, a news reporter (Lara Dutta) develops a liking towards Rathod, but the latter is still traumatised and angered on his wife's death.

Azhar returns home after the exile, but seeking the same motive of destruction: planning a bomb blast on train with passengers. He kills Rathod's friend, Inspector Deepak and is on the loose. Rathod learns that Azhar is none other than Amjad's younger brother, Munna, and arrests Amjad. Azhar calls Rathod at the Bandra Terminus where he kept passengers as hostages, with a deal to release his aide Masood (Ashok Samarth) and Amjad and demands a helicopter for escaping to Pakistan. Rathod goes according to the plan and reaches the station where a horrified Amjad learns that his brother is a terrorist. Amjad pleads Azhar to leave the innocent people but the latter denies by naming his actions as jihad. A fight ensues on during explosion at the station which Rathod and Amjad kills Azhar's men. Just when Azhar and Masood tries to attack Rathod and Amjad, both shoot them down. Rathod condoles Amjad to which the latter refuses and disowns Azhar instead, stating that any person who kills innocent people in the name of religion should be gunned down. At the end, Rathod, Amjad and Avinash along with the hostages returns from the ambush.

Cast
 Ajay Devgn as Inspector Ajit Rathod
 Akshay Kumar as Amjad Khan
 Lara Dutta as Meghna Malhotra
 Esha Deol as Heena Amjad khan
 Sunil Grover as Mahesh Sharma / Ranga (Avinash's friend)
 Laila as Indu Gill
 Rahul Dev as Azhar Khan (Munna), Amjad's brother and terrorist
 Viju Khote as Real Estate Agent
 Laxmikant Berde as Laxman Mundi
 Sharat Saxena as Heena's father
 Asrani as Film Director
 Himani Shivpuri as Indu's mother
 Tusshar Kapoor as Avinash Kapoor / Rana
 Vivek Vaswani as Agarwal
 Archana Puran Singh as Rajjo
 Beena as Amjad's mother
 Ashok Samarth as Masood
 Mac Mohan
 Koena Mitra as Sonali Rathod (special appearance)
 Vidyut Jammwal as a background dancer in the song "Rain Rain"

Soundtrack

Critical reception
Sumit Bhattacharya from Rediff criticised the film, stating "Insan could be good for you. If you suffer from depression, or are traumatised, or suffer from insomnia". Planet Bollywood rated the film 4.5/10, stating, "The lone actor worth watching in the enterprise is Akshay Kumar, who is continuing to solidify his status as one of the most versatile, bankable, and talented actors in Hindi commercial cinema today. His mirth-evoking turn strikes a near-perfect balance between artistic integrity and mass-oriented entertainment. Kumar serves as a reminder of the kind of aesthetic the film should have had - unpretentious about its populist intentions, but still sincere enough not to insult audience intelligence." Bollywood Mantra stated, "INSAN belongs to Akshay Kumar completely. The actor has a better role and of course, better lines. Enacting a comic role yet again [he provided the light moments in an otherwise serious KHAKEE; also, he enacted the comic role in MUJHSE SHAADI KAROGI with aplomb], Akshay proves that there's more to him than just using fisticuffs. His sequences with Esha - especially the birthday portions - are simply hilarious."

References

External links
 
 Insan at Bollywood Hungama
 

Indian action films
2005 action films
2005 films
2000s Hindi-language films
Hindi remakes of Telugu films
Films set in Mumbai
Films about religious violence in India
Films about terrorism in India
Films about jihadism
Films about religion
Films scored by Himesh Reshammiya
Hostage taking
Indian crime drama films
Fictional portrayals of the Maharashtra Police
Films directed by K. Subash
Indian action thriller films
2000s masala films
Films about arms trafficking
Islamic terrorism in fiction